Bobby Tahouri is an American composer, musician, and record producer.

Life and work
Born and raised in Los Angeles, California, Bobby Tahouri comes from a musical family, and began playing piano at the age of seven. He studied piano and composition at the San Francisco Conservatory of Music and also at the California Institute of the Arts, where he received his bachelor's degree in Music Composition. Upon graduation, Tahouri continued his studies with notable film composer Ira Newborn, who was an important mentor for Tahouri in honing his musical craft in film.

In 2008, another composer encouraged Tahouri in the next step of his career. Academy Award Winning composer Hans Zimmer invited Tahouri to be a part of Remote Control Productions, where he composed additional music and provided arrangements for many projects, including Paramount Pictures’ Iron Man, Warner Bros. Clash of the Titans, and HBO’s Game of Thrones. Tahouri has also provided additional music on many other projects, including the Emmy-Award-winning Steven Spielberg produced miniseries Into the West, DreamWorks/Paramount Pictures’ Disturbia, 20th Century Fox’s Hitman, and Universal Pictures’ Despicable Me 2, working alongside composers Geoff Zanelli and Heitor Pereira.

Tahouri scored the comedy Zero Charisma (distributed by Nerdist Industries and Tribeca Film), winner of the Audience Award at 2013’s SXSW film festival. He composed the main theme to the documentary series The Haunting Of, and collaborated with producer Rodney Jerkins on the Nickelodeon teen musical Rags, providing the orchestral score for the musical.

In the video game world, Tahouri is best known for composing the scores to Marvel's Avengers and Rise of the Tomb Raider (Crystal Dynamics). Tahouri also worked with Evanescence in 2019, co-producing and providing synth programming for the song The Chain by Fleetwood Mac, which was used in the Gears 5 video game trailer release.

Discography

Theatrical films

Short films

Television

Video games

Music production

References

External links

American film score composers
American male composers
American male film score composers
American male musicians
American record producers
American television composers
Living people
Male television composers
Video game composers
Year of birth missing (living people)